Francis Nicoll Zabriskie (1810–1881) was an American theologian, essayist and churchman.

He also wrote under the pseudonym "Old Colony".

References

American theologians
1810 births
1881 deaths